Baghramian may refer to:
Movses Baghramian
Hovhannes Bagramyan, Marshal of the Soviet Union
Maria Baghramian (born 1954), Iranian philosopher
Baghramyan, Ararat, Armenia
Baghramyan, Armavir, Armenia
Baghramyan, Echmiadzin, Armenia

Armenian-language surnames